This is a list of frigates of World War II. The list includes frigate-class ships, such as US Navy "destroyer escorts", and British "escort destroyers" and sloops but US Navy "escort destroyers", are destroyer-class vessels and found in that list.

For the Royal Navy, the distinction between frigate and destroyer was whether the vessel carried torpedo tubes. The Type III Hunt-class destroyers were equipped with torpedo tubes; all Hunt-class were capable of 27 knots compared to the 20 knots of the River-class frigates

The List of ships of World War II contains major military vessels of the war, arranged alphabetically and by type. The list includes armed vessels that served during the war and in the immediate aftermath, inclusive of localized ongoing combat operations, garrison surrenders, post-surrender occupation, colony re-occupation, troop and prisoner repatriation, to the end of 1945.

For smaller vessels, see also List of World War II ships of less than 1000 tons. Some uncompleted Axis ships are included, out of historic interest. Ships are designated to the country under which they operated for the longest period of the World War II, regardless of where they were built or previous service history.

List

References

Bibliography

 
Lists of World War II ships by type
World War II